DCTV may refer to:

DCTV (TV station), a station in Washington, D.C.
Digital cable television, the distribution method
Downtown Community Television Center, a community media center in Manhattan, New York City
Dublin Community Television
DC TV, was a part of DC Entertainment.